Banqiao is a railway and metro station in New Taipei, Taiwan served by Taiwan High Speed Rail, TRA and Taipei Metro. With the exception of the Circular Line, all other tracks and platforms in the station are located underground. The station is served by the fastest HSR express services of the 1 series.

The current station building opened in 1999 for TRA, 2006 for Taipei Metro, and 2007 for HSR. The station currently handles over 77 million entries and exits per year. The elevated metro station of the Circular line opened on 31 January 2020.

Station overview

The three-level consists of a 25-story building above ground and 5 underground station stories; it is Taiwan's tallest station building. It includes platforms for the TRA, THSR, and Taipei Metro. The new station building was built as part of the Taipei Railway Underground Project to move railway lines in the city underground.

Public art
Titled "Evolution Orbit", the Taipei Metro platform has artwork consisting of 12 colorful rings affixed to columns on the platform. These rings complete a cycle every hour and also move whenever a train enters the station.

Station layout

HSR services
HSR services 1xx, (1)2xx, (1)3xx, (1)5xx, (1)6xx, and (8)8xx call at this station.

Around the station
Transport Stations
 Intercity Bus Station (next to the station)
 Local Bus Station (next to the station)
Government Offices
 New Taipei City Hall (500m to the southeast)
 Bureau of High Speed Rail, MOTC (inside the station)
 Railway Reconstruction Bureau, MOTC (inside the station)
Stadiums and Parks
 Banqiao Stadium (950m to the west)
 Xianmin Plaza (100m to the southeast)
Schools
 New Taipei Municipal Banqiao High School (between this station and Fuzhong Station)
 New Taipei Municipal Haishan High School (850m to the southeast)
 New Taipei Municipal Zhongshan Junior High School (750m to the northeast)
Shopping Malls
 Far Eastern Department Store (350m to the south)
Medical Facilities
 Hsiao Chung-Cheng Hospital (near Fuzhong Station)

See also
 List of railway stations in Taiwan

References

External links
THSR Banqiao Station
TRA Banqiao Station
Taiwan Railway Administration
TRTC Route Map & Timetables

Railway stations served by Taiwan High Speed Rail
Railway stations served by Taiwan Railways Administration
Railway stations in New Taipei
Bannan line stations
1901 establishments in Taiwan
Circular line stations (Taipei Metro)